Begues is a municipality in the comarca of Baix Llobregat in Catalonia, Spain. 
It is situated in the south-west of the comarca, and its municipal territory covers most of the Garraf massif including the peaks of el Montau (658 m) and La Morella (594 m).

Begues is an important tourist centre, and it is connected with Avinyonet del Penedès and with Gavà by a local road.  Recently, Begues signed a contract with the mental asylum "Pere Mata" so that the mentally challenged could contribute to the village's economy by wrapping up the popular Spanish lollipop Chupa Chups in the local factory.

Demography

References

 Panareda Clopés, Josep Maria; Rios Calvet, Jaume; Rabella Vives, Josep Maria (1989). Guia de Catalunya, Barcelona: Caixa de Catalunya.  (Spanish).  (Catalan).

External links
 Government data pages 

Municipalities in Baix Llobregat